3CRR may refer to:

 Third Cambridge Catalogue of Radio Sources, revised edition
 Radio station ABC Ballarat, callsign 3CRR